René Beuker (born 15 May 1965) is a former Dutch racing cyclist. He rode in seven Grand Tours between 1986 and 1991.

References

External links

1965 births
Living people
Dutch male cyclists
People from Bussum
Cyclists from North Holland